Desulfovibrio alcoholivorans  is a bacterium from the genus of Desulfovibrio which has been isolated from alcohol industry waste water in France.

References

Further reading

External links
Type strain of Desulfovibrio alcoholivorans at BacDive -  the Bacterial Diversity Metadatabase	

Bacteria described in 1995
Desulfovibrio